In music, Op. 107 stands for Opus number 107. Compositions that are assigned this number include:

 Beethoven – Ten National Airs with Variations for Flute and Piano
 Chaminade – Flute Concertino
 Dvořák – The Water Goblin
 Mendelssohn – Symphony No. 5
 Schumann – 6 Gesänge
 Shostakovich – Cello Concerto No. 1